Dimethylglycine (DMG) is a derivative of the amino acid glycine with the structural formula (CH3)2NCH2COOH. It can be found in beans and liver, and has a sweet taste. It can be formed from trimethylglycine upon the loss of one of its methyl groups.  It is also a byproduct of the metabolism of choline.

When DMG was first discovered, it was referred to as Vitamin B16, but, unlike true B vitamins, deficiency of DMG in the diet does not lead to any ill-effects and it is synthesized by the human body in the citric acid cycle meaning it does not meet the definition of a vitamin.

Uses
Dimethylglycine has been suggested for use as an athletic performance enhancer, immunostimulant, and a treatment for autism, epilepsy, or mitochondrial disease. There is no evidence that dimethylglycine is effective for treating mitochondrial disease. Published studies on the subject have shown little to no difference between DMG treatment and placebo in autism spectrum disorders.

Biological activity
Dimethylglycine has been found to act as an agonist of the glycine site of the NMDA receptor.

Preparation
This compound is commercially available as the free form amino acid, and as the hydrochloride salt []. DMG may be prepared by the alkylation of glycine via the Eschweiler–Clarke reaction. In this reaction, glycine is treated with aqueous formaldehyde in formic acid that serves as both solvent and reductant. Hydrochloric acid is added thereafter to give the hydrochloride salt. The free amino acid may have been obtained by neutralization of the acid salt, which has been performed with silver oxide.

H2NCH2COOH + 2 CH2O + 2 HCOOH → (CH3)2NCH2COOH + 2 CO2 + 2 H2O

See also
 Monomethylglycine

References

Amino acids
Dietary supplements
NMDA receptor agonists
Food additives